Alan David Walder (13 November 1928 – 26 October 1978) was a British Conservative Party politician.

Born in St Pancras, London, Walder was educated at Latymer School and Christ Church, Oxford. He was commissioned into the Royal Artillery in 1948. In 1953 he transferred to the 4th Hussars (Army Emergency Reserve) and was promoted lieutenant. He was promoted captain in 1956. He became a barrister, called to the bar by Inner Temple in 1956.

He unsuccessfully contested the Leicester South West constituency at the 1959 general election.
He was elected Member of Parliament (MP) for High Peak at a 1961 by-election, but lost the seat at the 1966 general election, to Labour's Peter Jackson.

He was returned to the House of Commons at the 1970 general election as MP for Clitheroe, which he held until his death in Chelsea in 1978 at the age of 49.  Walder was an assistant government whip from 1973 to 1974.

Walder coined "Walder's Law" which stated that the first three speakers at any meeting of the 1922 Committee were "Mad."

Walder's successor at the by-election after his death was David Waddington.

Walder was also a noted author and military historian. His works included humorous fiction relating primarily to his experiences in the army and politics, and comprised:
Bags of Swank (1963)
The Short List (1964)
The House Party (1966)
The Fair Ladies of Salamanca (1967)
The Chanak Affair (1969)
The Short Victorious War: Russo-Japanese Conflict 1904–5 (1973)
Nelson (1978).

References

Times Guide to the House of Commons October 1974

External links 
 

1928 births
1978 deaths
Royal Artillery officers
4th Queen's Own Hussars officers
Members of the Inner Temple
Conservative Party (UK) MPs for English constituencies
Members of the Parliament of the United Kingdom for constituencies in Derbyshire
UK MPs 1959–1964
UK MPs 1964–1966
UK MPs 1970–1974
UK MPs 1974
UK MPs 1974–1979
People from St Pancras, London
20th-century British writers
British military historians
People educated at The Latymer School
20th-century British historians
20th-century British lawyers
High Peak, Derbyshire